Alcmund may refer to:

Alcmund of Hexham (died 780 or 781), saint, bishop of Hexham
Alcmund of Derby (died ), saint, also known as Alcmund of Lilleshall

See also
Ealhmund

Old English given names
Masculine given names